Samiullah Khan (Urdu: سمیع اللہ خان; born 6 September 1951, in Bahawalpur) is a former field hockey player from Pakistan, who was nicknamed The Flying Horse because of his great speed. He is a former and veteran player of the Olympic Games.

Career
He played as a left winger for his native country in the 1970s and 1980s.

He was instrumental in Pakistan's bronze medal in the 1976 Summer Olympics in Montreal, and winning gold in the Asian Games in Bangkok in 1978 and India in 1982. He was Vice-Captain of the Pakistan hockey Team that won the World Cup in Mumbai, India in 1982 and was the team Captain that won the Asian Games in Delhi by defeating India 7-1 the same year.  His remarkable ball control with enormous speed was a rare and lethal  combination that can be seen in Hockey. With his thrilling runs, body dodges, and large leaps he could beat and outpace his opponents and penetrate any defense to score goals or create scoring opportunities for his team mates.  

His brother Kaleemullah Khan also played for the national field hockey team of Pakistan. Samiullah retired from international hockey in 1982 while he was the captain of the Pakistan team.  Samiullah Khan later managed the Pakistan Hockey Team, quitting in 2005.

Samiullah is also the nephew of Motiullah, who was a member of the 1960 Rome Olympics gold-winning Pakistan hockey side.

Awards and recognition
 Pride of Performance Award in 1983 by the President of Pakistan
 Sitara-i-Imtiaz (Star of Excellence) Award by the President of Pakistan in 2014

References

External links
 

1951 births
Living people
Pakistani male field hockey players
Olympic field hockey players of Pakistan
Olympic bronze medalists for Pakistan
Olympic medalists in field hockey
Medalists at the 1976 Summer Olympics
Field hockey players at the 1976 Summer Olympics
Asian Games medalists in field hockey
Field hockey players at the 1974 Asian Games
Field hockey players at the 1978 Asian Games
Field hockey players at the 1982 Asian Games
Recipients of the Pride of Performance
Recipients of Sitara-i-Imtiaz
Asian Games gold medalists for Pakistan
Medalists at the 1974 Asian Games
Medalists at the 1978 Asian Games
Medalists at the 1982 Asian Games
1978 Men's Hockey World Cup players